Frölunda is the borough Västra Frölunda in the city of Gothenburg, Sweden.

Frölunda or Västra Frölunda may also refer to:

Gothenburg, Sweden
 Frölunda Parish, a parish in the Diocese of Gothenburg
 Frölunda Torg, a shopping centre
 Frölundaborg or Campus Frölunda, an ice hockey arena

Sport
 Frölunda HC or Frölunda Indians, formerly Västra Frölunda HC, an ice hockey team from Gothenburg
 Västra Frölunda IF, a football club from Gothenburg
 Västra Frölunda IF Handball, a handball club from Gothenburg

See also
 Östra Frölunda, a village in Svenljunga Municipality, Västra Götaland County, Sweden